KMJG was a non-commercial radio station in Homer, Alaska, broadcasting on 88.9 FM. KMJG was a simulcast of KWJG.

The station's license was cancelled by the Federal Communications Commission on February 27, 2020, due to KMJG's extended period of silence.

See also
List of community radio stations in the United States

External links

MJG
Radio stations established in 2003
2003 establishments in Alaska
Defunct radio stations in the United States
Radio stations disestablished in 2020
2020 disestablishments in Alaska
Defunct community radio stations in the United States
MJG